Fat Guy Stuck in Internet is an American science-fiction comedy television series created by John Gemberling and Curtis Gwinn for Cartoon Network's late-night adult-oriented programming block Adult Swim; and ended with a total of ten episodes.

An adaptation/remake of Gemberling and Gwinn's 2005 Channel 102 web series Gemberling, Fat Guy Stuck in Internet follows computer programmer Ken Gemberling – the titular "Fat Guy" – who is accidentally sucked into his computer and learns he is destined to save cyberspace from a variety of evils. After a pilot aired in May 2007, Adult Swim commissioned a full season of Fat Guy Stuck in Internet which lasted ten episodes, airing from June 2008 to August 2008. Following the run of its first season, the channel chose not to renew the show for a second, effectively cancelling the series.

Setting and premise
Hotshot computer programmer Ken Gemberling is the top programmer at Ynapmoclive Interactive, but is also remarkably rude, selfish, and arrogant. After dumping beer on his computer keyboard, Gemberling is inexplicably sucked into his computer, landing in the farthest reaches of the internet where he soon discovers that he is in fact "The Chosen One", prophesied to save cyberspace from a devastating virus known as the nanoplague. Joined by a pair of humanoid "programs" named Bit and Byte, Gemberling embarks on an epic adventure to save the internet, return home and unleash the hero within, all the while hunted through cyberspace by ruthless white trash bounty hunter Chains.

Production
Fat Guy Stuck in Internet first appeared as a 2005 web series created by Upright Citizens Brigade alumni John Gemberling and Curtis Gwinn, known as the comedy duo of The Cowboy & John. Originally titled Gemberling, the series followed the same storyline and major plot points of its television adaptation, featuring much of the same cast (with the notable exception of Katie Dippold in the role of Byte) though with a considerably lower budget and more profanity. Aired in five-minute episodes as part of Channel 102, Gemberling became Channel 102's longest-running original series, lasting a total of eight episodes including a 17-minute finale. The shorts also aired as part of Fuse TVs Munchies.

In January 2007, Cartoon Network announced that they had commissioned Gemberling and Gwinn to create a series based on Gemberling as part of the Adult Swim programming block. Adult Swim made the decision to rename the series as Fat Guy Stuck in Internet, a title which both creators disliked. The entirety of the series was filmed and produced inside of a warehouse in Bushwick, Brooklyn. On May 30, 2008, Gemberling and Gwinn premiered Fat Guy Stuck in Internet before a live audience at the Upright Citizens Brigade theatre in New York City.

Fat Guy Stuck in Internet uses a mix of greenscreen effects, hard sets, miniatures, matte paintings and computer animation to create the show's cyberspace environment, though carries over many of the intentionally low-budget props and special effects from the web series (e.g. broom handles being used as laser-shooting weapons, etc.).

The basic premise of Fat Guy Stuck in Internet is a parody of the film Tron, from which the series also borrows several visual elements. Gemberling and Gwinn have noted further parody and stylistic influence taken from The Matrix, Star Wars, The Lord of the Rings and Stephen King, in particular his Dark Tower series.

Characters

 Gemberling (John Gemberling) - A skilled but slovenly programmer in real life otherwise recognized by his given internet handle of "Fat Guy Stuck in Internet", Gemberling is actually the prophesied savior of the internet, destined to save cyberspace from evil. At first a selfish jerk, Gemberling's quest brings out his inner goodness and strength as he learns the value of heroism and friendship.
 Chains (Curtis Gwinn) - A dim-witted redneck bounty hunter hired by the C.E.O. to track Gemberling through cyberspace, Chains is more interested in smoking pot and eating cyberchicken than doing his job. Chains eventually becomes Gemberling's troublesome sidekick.
 Byte (Liz Cackowski) - The sister of Bit, Byte is a humanoid computer program who aides Gemberling early in his quest, placing great confidence and belief in his abilities. She is later kidnapped by Chains and converted to evil by the C.E.O.
 Bit (Neil Casey) - Brother of Byte, Bit is another humanoid program who assists Gemberling in his adventure. Along with Byte, he is kidnapped by Chains and ultimately suffers his fate at the hands of his newly evil sister.
 The C.E.O. (John Gemberling) - The villainous (albeit inept) C.E.O. of Ynapmoclive Interactive, he controls the nanoplague which will destroy the internet.

Episodes

International broadcast 
In Canada, Fat Guy Stuck in Internet previously aired on G4's Adult Digital Distraction block, and on the Canadian version of Adult Swim.

Reception
Fat Guy Stuck in Internet received mixed reviews from viewers and critics. The A.V. Club, having reviewed every episode as part of their "Adult Swim Sunday" column, was one of the series' harsher critics, primarily criticizing the show's "cheap" writing, poor movie parodies and John Gemberling's "smirking, mediocre" performance. As the series progressed, however, the reception became a bit warmer, with later episodes being called "not completely terrible" and "not entirely unpleasant" to the final episode being described as "going out with a bang", the reviewer admitting "for a couple minutes, I actually found myself engaged". Time looked positively on the series, noting the show "delivers", being "striking-looking and even good-hearted in its own bizarre way".

Notes

References

External links
 
 

2000s American comic science fiction television series
2007 American television series debuts
2008 American television series endings
Mass media about Internet culture
Adult Swim original programming
Channel 101
English-language television shows
Television series by Williams Street